The International Phonetic Alphabet uses a breve  to indicate a speech sound (usually a vowel) with extra-short duration. An example from English is the short schwa of the word police . This is typical of vowel reduction.

Before the 1989 Kiel Convention, the breve was used for a non-syllabic vowel (that is, part of a diphthong), which is now indicated by an  breve placed under the vowel letter, as in eye . It is also sometimes used for any flap consonants missing dedicated symbols in the IPA, since a flap is in effect a very brief stop.

References

Phonetics